Love Me Like You Used To is the sixteenth studio album by American country music artist Tanya Tucker, released in 1987. Continuing the success of her preceding comeback album Girls Like Me, the album produced three Billboard Top Ten Country singles, with "If It Don't Come Easy" and the collaboration with Paul Davis and Paul Overstreet, "I Won't Take Less Than Your Love" both peaking at #1, and the title track "Love Me Like You Used To" rising to #2. The album rose to #10 on the Country Albums chart.

Track listing

Personnel
Tanya Tucker - lead vocals, backing vocals
Eddie Bayers - drums
Kenny Bell - acoustic guitar
Paul Davis - vocals on "I Won't Take Less Than Your Love" 
Steve Gibson - electric guitar
Mitch Humphries - keyboards
Dave Innis - synthesizer
Kenny Mims - electric guitar
Paul Overstreet - vocals on "I Won't Take Less Than Your Love"
James Stroud - drums 
Bob Wray - bass guitar

Chart performance

References

1987 albums
Capitol Records albums
Tanya Tucker albums
Albums produced by Jerry Crutchfield